Pei Zhanpeng (born 7 February 1999) is a Chinese footballer who plays as a defender.

Club career
Pei joined Spanish club Atlético Madrid in 2012, as part of a Wanda Group initiative to encourage young Chinese footballers to play in Spain.

Career statistics

Club
.

References

1999 births
Living people
Chinese footballers
Chinese expatriate footballers
Association football defenders
Atlético Madrid footballers
Dalian Professional F.C. players
Suzhou Dongwu F.C. players
Chinese expatriate sportspeople in Spain
Expatriate footballers in Spain